Hannington Bugingo (born 12 May 1981) is a Ugandan comedian, actor, film producer, and advertising strategist. He is the managing director of Fun Factory Uganda and also the founding president of The Uganda Comedians Association (TUCA). He is known for his role as Sam in Mizigo Express and also portrays various characters in Fun Factory's Comedicine.

Early life and education
Hannington Bugingo was born 12 May 1981 at Mengo Hospital in Kampala, Uganda to Charles Bafakuleka Mwebaze, a reverend, and Ruth Nakate, a businesswoman. The last-born in a family of five, Bugingo attended Namalemba Mixed Day and Boarding School, Busembatya, Iganga, then St. Leo's College, Kyegobe, Fort Portal for his O-levels, and later went to Lubiri Secondary School for his A-levels. Afterward, he joined Makerere University, where he pursued and completed a Bachelor of Arts in Drama

Career

Early work
Towards his second year of university, Bugingo went to Mbale to do his practical exams. "We were performing a play titled The Bear and I was the lead actor. The audience applauded me quite a lot. They were impressed with my acting so I convinced myself that I could act." It was after the play that his then-lecturer, Philip Luswata, approached him and suggested the idea of forming a theatre group. When they went back to Kampala, Bugingo, together with Phillip Luswata, Kwezi Kaganda, Farouq Twesigye, Frobisha Lwanga, Faith Kimuli, and Julius Lugaya met and formed Theatre Factory. The group's first performance was in mid-September 2003 in front of only fifteen people, comprising the owner and staff members of his workplace. Initially, they were paid with a meal of plain chips only because the owner said he had invested in that project and didn't have money to pay them.

2006–2009
In 2006, Bugingo acted as the Minister of Health's bodyguard in The Last King of Scotland , starring Forest Whitaker and Kerry Washington. In the same year, he acted as Ragos in a short film called Roho alongside Lupita Nyong'o.

In 2008, Bugingo acted in Kiwani as Kaggwa beside Juliana Kanyomozi. Together with Henry H Ssali, he also co-directed the movie. While still with Theatre Factory, he joined Scanad Uganda Limited, an advertising agency, in 2008. He worked there until 2011, when Metropolitan Republic headhunted him as a copy writer. It was during this time that Bugingo won a bronze medal with Metropolitan Republic at The Loerie Awards for the MTN SIM card registration campaign.

2010–present
In January 2010, Bugingo, together with thirteen other members, after a disagreement with the administration of Theatre Factory, broke away and formed a new group called Fun Factory Uganda. He became its general manager.

In 2013, Bugingo quit his job as a creative strategist at Metropolitan Republic to concentrate on Fun Factory Uganda and the advertising agency that he and his friends had opened, called KIB Marketing and Advertising Agency.

In 2015, he produced the film Situka. "The project, meant to encourage youths to 'stand up' (Situka) for their rights, think of the future...is a story that covers the entire country, Africa, and the globe".

In February 2019, The Uganda Comedians Association (TUCA) was formed and Bugingo was elected as the founding president, while promising to wipe out vulgarity from the comedy industry. As TUCA head, he wrote to president Yoweri Museveni to push for enforcement of copyright law to protect the works of Ugandan artists.

In 2020, Bugingo raised money to launch the career of up-and-coming artist Razor Blade Lutabalala.

Personal life
Bugingo, or "Bujju", as he is commonly known in the comedy industry married Esther Mirembe Bugingo on 18 September 2009. His wife works with the Ministry of Gender, Labour and Social Development.

In January 2019, the government of Uganda proposed a bill suggesting every artist should be registered under the Ministry of Gender, Labour and Social Development. In that proposed bill, every artist had to first get authorization from the ministry before shooting a video. Bugingo had this to say about it: "We are not trying to fight the government; neither are we saying that all points highlighted in the bill are wrong. But as artistes, we were not represented well. Our biggest problems are not performing for more than two hour or drugs, but copyright. The government will definitely earn much if they pass this bill, but what is in for us artistes?"

In March 2019, Bugingo was inducted into the Rotary Club of Kampala Munyonyo.

Filmography

Film

Television

References

External links
 

1981 births
Living people